Helen Searles Westbrook (October 15, 1889 – 1967) was an American composer and organist who appeared with Chicago Symphony.

Life 
Westbrook began organ lessons at age eleven with her mother, who was also an organist. Westbrook then studied with Arthur Dunham, Frank van Dusen, Wilhelm Middleschutte and Adolf Weidig at the American Conservatory, where she received a gold medal, as well as a young American Artists award. She married James Westbrook.

Westbrook was a theatre organist in Chicago. She also played with the Chicago Opera Company under Bruno Walter, as an organ soloist with Chicago Symphony, and on a WGN radio program for CBS which used her compositions "Dusk at Friendship Lake" and "Retrospection" as the program's theme songs. She was the music director at Central Church in Chicago.

Westbrook was a member of the American Society of Composers, Authors, and Publishers (ASCAP) and the Chicago Club of Women Organists. She  helped manage the Club's "Florence B. Price Organ Composition Contest" in 1954.

Through Replica Records, Westbrook released at least one 33 rpm recording ("Helen's Holiday"), as well as three 45 rpm recordings with Cecil Roy and Betty Barrie: 1) Buddy's Butterfly 2) The Thistle/Buddy's Garden 3) Christmas Eve/Plasco Toys.

Compositions 
Westbrook's compositions include:

Organ 
 Andante Religioso
 Chanson Triste
 Concert Piece in D
 Dusk at Friendship Lake, used as the theme song to her radio program.
 Here Comes Santa Claus 
 Intermezzo
 Laughing Sprites
 Lento
 Melodie
 Menuett in Olden Style
 On the Ontonagon River
 Pastorale Scherzo 
 Poem for Autumn
 Retrospection, used as the theme song to her radio program.
 Waltz Circe

Vocal 
 Alabaster
 Christ My Refuge (text by Mary Baker Eddy)
 Hindu Cradle Song
 If You Call Me
 Invincible (text by Sarojini Naidu)
 Magnificat (text by Helene Grossenbacher)
 March Beside Him, Lord
 Music I Heard With You (text by Conrad Aiken)
 Six Indian Songs
 Solace (text by Josephine Hancock Logan)
 Wedding Prayer (text by Curt A. Mundstock)

References

External links 
 
 Chikago Women Organists / Guests of Helen Westbrook The Diapason, 1 January 1945, p. 7

American women classical composers
American classical composers
American organists
1889 births
1967 deaths